is a subway station on the Toei Mita Line in Itabashi, Tokyo, Japan, operated by Toei Subway.

It is located in the northern part of Tokyo, under the intersection of Nakasendo and Kannana-dori.

Platforms
The station consists of two side platforms.

History
The station opened on 27 December 1968.

References

External links
 Itabashihoncho Station information (Toei)

Railway stations in Japan opened in 1968
Railway stations in Tokyo
Toei Mita Line